Viola is an unincorporated community in eastern Linn County, Iowa, United States. It lies along local roads, northeast of the city of Cedar Rapids, the county seat of Linn County. Its elevation is 978 feet (298 m). Although Viola is unincorporated, it has a post office, with the ZIP code of 52350, which opened on 7 October 1861.

History
Viola was laid out in 1861. It was named for Miss Viola Leonard, daughter of a landowner.

Education 
Anamosa Community School District operates local area public schools.

References

Unincorporated communities in Linn County, Iowa
Unincorporated communities in Iowa
1861 establishments in Iowa